Ossokmanuan Lake is a reservoir lake in western Labrador, Newfoundland and Labrador, Canada. It was formed in the early 1960s by the Twin Falls hydroelectric plant. In 1976 it had a reported 2.8 x 109 m3 of active storage.

References

Labrador
Lakes of Newfoundland and Labrador